Harold Hanson (born July 16, 1999) is an American professional soccer player who plays as a right back for Albion San Diego in the National Independent Soccer Association.

Career
Born in Ontario, California, Hanson signed for Portland Timbers 2, the reserve side of Portland Timbers, on March 17, 2017. He made his professional debut for Timbers 2 on April 9, 2017 against Orange County SC. Hanson started the match as Timbers 2 were defeated 2–1. On June 14, Hanson was called-up to the Portland Timbers first-team for their U.S. Open Cup match against the Seattle Sounders FC. He started the match and played the whole 90 minutes as Portland were knocked-out 2–1.

On July 22, 2017, due to not having enough outfielders, Hanson signed a short-term contract with the Portland Timbers first-team for their Major League Soccer match against the Vancouver Whitecaps FC. He came off the bench in that match in the 89th minute as a substitute for Dairon Asprilla as the Timbers won 2–1.

On January 30, 2019, it was announced that Hanson had signed a new contract with Portland Timbers 2. Timbers 2 opted to stop operating following the 2020 season.

Hanson joined National Independent Soccer Association club Albion San Diego in February 2022.

Career statistics

References

External links 
 Portland Timbers profile.

1999 births
Living people
People from Ontario, California
American soccer players
Portland Timbers 2 players
Portland Timbers players
Association football defenders
Soccer players from California
USL Championship players
Major League Soccer players
National Independent Soccer Association players
Sportspeople from San Bernardino County, California